The 1970 United States redistricting cycle took place following the completion of the 1970 United States census. In all fifty states, various bodies re-drew state legislative and congressional districts. States that are apportioned more than one seat in the United States House of Representatives also drew new districts for that legislative body. The resulting new districts were first implemented for the 1972 elections.

U.S. House districts

References

See also 

 Redistricting in the United States

Redistricting in the United States
Electoral geography of the United States
1970 in American politics